Western Man is an album by American pianist, vocalist and composer Mose Allison recorded for the Atlantic label in 1971.

Reception

Allmusic awarded the album 3 stars stating, "Allison's wry wit is in fine form, and his ironic yet truthful lyrics are always fun to hear". The Penguin Guide to Jazz commented on the distant studio sound quality and the strange choice of drummer.

Track listing
All compositions by Mose Allison except as indicated
 "If You Only Knew" – 2:40
 "How Much Truth" – 3:36
 "Benediction" – 2:00
 "Night Club" – 2:36
 "Do Nothing till You Hear from Me" (Duke Ellington, Bob Russell) – 3:13
 "Mountains" – 5:25
 "Western Man" – 3:14
 "Ask Me Nice" – 3:15
 "Tell Me Something" – 3:43
 "If You've Got the Money I've Got the Time" (Jim Beck, Lefty Frizzell) – 3:15
 "Meadows" – 3:50

Personnel 
Mose Allison – piano, electric piano, vocals
Chuck Rainey – electric bass
Billy Cobham – drums

References 

1971 albums
Mose Allison albums
Atlantic Records albums
Albums produced by Joel Dorn